Prof. Robert Geoffrey "Geoff" Richards is the Executive Director Research & Development for the AO Foundation and director of AO Research Institute Davos at the AO Foundation.  He is a Fellow of the Learned Society of Wales (FLSW), Fellow of Biomaterial Science and Engineering (FBSE), Fellow of International Orthopaedic Research (FIOR),  Fellow of the Orthopaedic Research Society and honorary Fellow Aberystwyth University. He is co-Founder and Editor-in-Chief of the eCM Open Access Journal, arguably the first online open access journal in the world.

Career
Since 1991, Richards has been working for the AO Research Institute Davos (ARI) performing R&D of fracture fixation devices. His current position is both Executive Director Research & Development for the AO Foundation and Director of Research and Development, a position he has held since 2009. His research into implant surfaces has led to major changes in the design and manufacture of internal fracture fixation products, delivering improved clinical outcomes for patients worldwide. Currently, he holds a Professorship at Cardiff University, Wales, Great Britain along with two positions as chair, one at the Faculty of Medicine, University of Freiburg, Germany and the other at the First Affiliated Hospital, Sun-Yat-sen University, Guangzhou, China  In 2020 he became Fellow of the Learned Society of Wales (FLSW) -Election to Fellowship is a public recognition of excellence. All our Fellows have made an outstanding contribution to the world of learning and have a demonstrable connection to Wales. He is a fellow of Biomaterials Science and Engineering; International Orthopedic Research; and recently has become a fellow of the Orthopaedic research society ORS Fellows are the longstanding members of the ORS who have demonstrated exemplary service and leadership, substantial achievement, expert knowledge, and significant contributions to the ORS, its governance, and the field of musculoskeletal research. Fellows represent ORS as the thought leaders and experts in their respective disciplines. Fellows also serve as role models in the ORS community and in the field of musculoskeletal research. In 1999, he co-founded the eCM Journal. In 2016 he received Doctor Honoris Causa from the Technical University of Varna, Bulgaria

Education
Richards graduated from the University of Wales, Aberystwyth with a B.Sc., in 1990. He continued there with his studies, completing a Master of Science in 1991. He then completed his PhD, Doctor of Philosophy at the same university in 1997.

Chairs
2016 Distinguished Professor, The First Affiliated Hospital, Sun Yat-sen University, Guangzhou, China.
2015 Honorary Professor, Faculty of Medicine, University of Freiburg, Germany.
2007 Honorary Professor, School of Biosciences, Cardiff University, Wales, Great Britain.
 2007-2012 Honorary Professor, Institute of Biological Sciences, Aberystwyth University, Wales Great Britain.
 2006-2009 Visiting Professor Institute of Biomaterials & Bioengineering, Tokyo Medical & Dental University, Japan.

Awards, honors, scientific appointments
 2020 announced as 2021 ORS (Orthopaedic Research Society) Fellow.
2020 Fellow of the Learned Society of Wales (FLSW) 25. 
2019 Honorary Fellow Aberystwyth University (Cymrawd er Anrhydedd Prifysgol Aberystwyth)
 2016 Doctor Honoris Causa, Technical University of Varna (BG)
 2016 Fellow of International Orthopaedic Research (FIOR)
 2012: Fellow Biomaterials Science and Engineering (FBSE)
 May 2010: Life Honorary Membership – Swiss Society for Biomaterials 
 2004-2012 Honorary Senior Research Fellow Faculty of Biomedical & Life Sciences, University of Glasgow, GB. 
 May 2004: Jean Leray Award (European Society for Biomaterials)
 1999-2007 Honorary Lecturer, Institute of Biological Sciences, Aberystwyth University, Wales

Society board memberships
 2019-2021 Global President TERMIS (Tissue Engineering & Regenerative Medicine International Society)
 2019 Past Chair of the International College of Fellows for Orthopaedic Research
 2016-2019 Chair of the International College of Fellows for Orthopaedic Research
 2013: Member of International Combined Orthopaedic Research Societies (ICORS) Steering Committee. 
 2014-2015 President of the Lions Club Davos-Klosters.
 2013-2015 Member TERMIS-EU & World Council Tissue Engineering & Regenerative Medicine International Society.
 2011-2016: Executive Committee member European Orthopaedic Research Society (EORS)
 2011-2013: Chair of the Infection Topic Committee, Orthopaedic Research Society (ORS)
 2013 Board member of the Academia Raetica, Switzerland. 
 2013 Board member and (2015) Vice President Science City Davos
 2013 Associate Editor of the Journal of Orthopaedic Translation.
 2000 Editor-in-Chief, webmaster, webeditor eCM journal
 1999 co-founder eCM journal((http://www.ecmjournal.org) with Dr Iolo ap Gwynn and the late Dr Godfried Roomans)), the first online open access journal in the fields of Biomaterials, Tissue Engineering & Regenerative Medicine and Orthopaedics (before the term open access existed) .

Publications
Richards has published over 200 peer reviewed articles. A partial list of these publications includes:
 
 ORCID http://orcid.org/0000-0002-7778-2480
 ResearcherID http://www.researcherid.com/rid/I-8235-2015
 Researchgate https://www.researchgate.net/profile/Robert_Richards2

References

Alumni of the University of Wales
British medical researchers
Living people
Year of birth missing (living people)